Zastenka is a rural locality (a selo) in Razdorsky Selsoviet, Kamyzyaksky District, Astrakhan Oblast, Russia. The population was 494 as of 2010. There are 3 streets.

Geography 
Zastenka is located 15 km southeast of Kamyzyak (the district's administrative centre) by road. Razdor is the nearest rural locality.

References 

Rural localities in Kamyzyaksky District